Agonopterix kuznetzovi is a moth of the family Depressariidae. It is found in Great Britain and Russia.

The wingspan is 15–20 mm. Adults are on wing from July to October and (after overwintering) in spring.

The larvae feed on Serratula tinctoria. They initially mine the leaves of their host plant. Larvae can be found from late May to June. They are pale green with a black head.

References

Moths described in 1983
Agonopterix
Moths of Europe